The 2014 All-Ireland Minor Hurling Championship is the 84th staging of the All-Ireland hurling championship for players under the age of eighteen since its establishment by the Gaelic Athletic Association in 1928. The championship began on 9 April 2014 and will end on 7 September 2014.

Waterford were the defending champions, however, they were defeated in the All-Ireland semi-final.

Kilkenny won the title after a 2-17 to 0-19 win against Limerick in the final on 7 September at Croke Park.	

Kilkenny's Alan Murphy was the championship's top scorer with 3-46.

Rresults

Leinster Minor Hurling Championship

Round 1

Round 2

Round 3

Quarter-finals

Semi-finals

Final

Munster Minor Hurling Championship

Quarter-finals

Playoffs

Semi-finals

Finals

Ulster Minor Hurling Championship

Quarter-final

Semi-finals

Final

All-Ireland Minor Hurling Championship

Quarter-finals

Semi-finals

Final

Championship statistics

Scoring
First goal of the championship: Eoghan Keniry for Cork against Kerry (Munster quarter-final, 9 April 2014)

Miscellaneous

 Kilkenny's score of just 0-3 against Dublin in their Leinster championship meeting is their lowest tally ever in a championship game.

Championship statistics

Top scorers

Top scorers overall

Top scorers in a single game

External links
 2014 Leinster Minor Hurling Championship fixtures
 2014 Munster Minor Hurling Championship fixtures
 2014 Ulster Minor Hurling Championship fixtures

References

Minor
All-Ireland Minor Hurling Championship